Viad Corp provides experiential leisure travel and face-to-face events in the United States, Canada, the United Kingdom, Europe, and the United Arab Emirates via two divisions: GES and Pursuit. 

Pursuit (formed in 2017) includes travel attractions and hotels in and around Banff, Denali, Glacier, Jasper, Kenai Fjords, and Waterton Lakes National Parks in Canada and the United States. Properties that Pursuit operates under its Glacier Park Collection include Grouse Mountain Lodge in Whitefish, Glacier Park Lodge in East Glacier, St. Mary Lodge and Resort in St. Mary, Stewart Hotel near Lake McDonald Lodge, Prince of Wales Hotel in Waterton, Alberta. Pursuit's Alaska Collection includes Denali Backcountry Lodge, Denali Backcountry Adventure, Denali Cabins, Talkeetna Alaskan Lodge, Seward Windsong Lodge, Kenai Fjords Wilderness Lodge, Kenai Fjords Tours.

GES partners with show organizers, exhibitors, and brand marketers to create face-to-face events. The company handles design and production, material handling, rigging, electrical, and other on-site event services.

The company evolved from The Greyhound Corporation, which established Greyhound Lines and later became a diversified conglomerate between the 1960s and the 1990s.

History
Viad Corp was founded in 1926 as Motor Transit Corporation after intercity bus operators Eric Wickman and Orville Caesar joined forces and consolidated several bus operations. By 1930, more than 100 bus lines had been consolidated and recognizing the need for a more memorable name, the company was renamed The Greyhound Corporation. The Greyhound name had its origins in the inaugural run of a bus route from Superior, Wisconsin, to Wausau, Wisconsin.  While passing through a small town, Ed Stone, the route's operator, saw the reflection of his bus in a store window. The reflection reminded him of a greyhound and he adopted that name for that segment of the Blue Goose Lines. The Greyhound name became popular, and was applied to the entire bus network as well as the parent company.

Wickman retired as president of Greyhound in 1946 and was succeeded by Caesar. Wickman died at the age of 66 in 1954. Caesar died on May 19, 1965, a day before his 75th birthday.

In 1954, Greyhound established Greyhound Financial Corporation, the captive finance operation of the bus line. During the 1960s, Greyhound began its transformation into a conglomerate by diversifying into other industries: financial services (Travelers Express); food and consumer products (Armour and Company); food service (Prophet Company); restaurants (Horne's); airport services (Aircraft Services International); and ocean cruises (Premier Cruise Line).

Greyhound exited the transportation industry with the sale of Greyhound Lines in 1987. By then, The Dial Corporation (formerly, Armour-Dial, Inc., established in 1967 as a subsidiary of Armour and Company) was its largest subsidiary. Greyhound was renamed Greyhound Dial Corporation in 1990 and as The Dial Corp the following year. After the renaming, the Dial consumer business became known as The Dial Corp Consumer Products Group.

The company exited the financial services industry in 1992 with the sale of GFC Financial Corporation (including Greyhound Financial Corporation, Greyhound European Financial Group and Verex Corporation).

In 1995, GFC Financial Corporation changed its name to The FINOVA Group, Inc. and Greyhound Financial Corporation to FINOVA Capital Corporation.

The FINOVA Group filed for bankruptcy in 2001 and was dissolved in 2009.

In 1996, the company announced the splitting of its businesses into two entities. The Dial consumer products business was spun-off as the new Dial Corporation.

After the split, the company was renamed Viad Corp and consisted of companies involved in airline catering (Dobbs International Service); airplane fueling and ground handling (Aircraft Service International); convention and exhibit services (GES Exposition Services and Exhibitgroup/Giltspur); concession operations (Glacier Park, Inc.); contract food services (Restaura, Inc.); ocean cruises (Premier Cruise Lines); airport and cruise ship duty-free concessions (Greyhound Leisure Services); travel services (Brewster Transport, Jetsave, and Crystal Holidays); and payment services (Travelers Express).

By early 21st century, most of the businesses were sold except for Travelers Express, Glacier Park, GES Exposition Services, and Exhibitgroup/Giltspur.

In 2003, Viad began the process of engineering a reverse tax-free spinoff of Travelers Express. Thus, a new subsidiary was formed, MoneyGram International, Inc., which early in 2004 received the payment services business and its stock was distributed to Viad stockholders. Viad then conducted a one-for-four reverse stock split.

Between 1981 and 2013, Glacier Park Inc. was also the concessionaire for Lake McDonald Lodge, Apgar Village Inn, Rising Sun Auto Camp, Swiftcurrent Inn, Many Glacier Hotel, Two Medicine Store, and the Red Jammers within Glacier National Park. The National Park Service awarded this concession to Xanterra Parks and Resorts starting in 2014.

In 2010, the company established GES (Global Experience Specialists, Inc., formerly GES Exposition Services, Inc.) by merging GES Exposition Services, Inc., Exhibitgroup/Giltspur, and Becker Group.

In 2012, Pursuit acquired the 162-room Banff International Hotel. Pursuit also operates other Banff and Jasper area attractions under the Brewster Travel Canada brand, including Banff's 133-room Mount Royal Hotel, Jasper National Park's 32-room Glacier View Lodge, Banff Lake Cruises and the Banff Gondola.

In 2017, the company established its Pursuit division and acquired FlyOver Canada, a 60-seat flight simulation experience in Canada Place, Vancouver, British Columbia which features various Canadian landmarks.

References

External links
 Viad Corp official website
 GES official website
 Pursuit Collection official website
 "Northland Greyhound Lines" (at Bluehounds and Redhounds), including the early history of The Greyhound Corporation
 Bluehounds and Redhounds, the history of Greyhound and Trailways
 "Greyhound Lines after WW2" (at Bluehounds and Redhounds)
 "The Scenicruiser" at Bluehounds and Redhounds

Companies based in Scottsdale, Arizona
Companies listed on the New York Stock Exchange
American companies established in 1926
American companies established in 1996
Corporate spin-offs
Marketing companies of the United States
Marketing companies established in 1926
Marketing companies established in 1996